Środa Śląska  is a town in the Lower Silesian Voivodeship, in south-western Poland. It is the seat of Środa Śląska County, and of the smaller administrative district (gmina) called Gmina Środa Śląska. As of 2019, the town has a population of 9,516. It is part of the Wrocław metropolitan area.

History

Środa Śląska is situated in the central part of the Lower Silesia region at the main transport routes joining the east and west of Europe. The name Środa means "Wednesday", as that was the day on which the weekly market took place. Transforming it from a small commercial settlement into a center of urban character was carried out by the Polish Duke Henry the Bearded (1202–1238) whose idea was to enhance the economic and political significance of the Silesia region as a means to re-unify the Polish Kingdom. He vested it with town rights before 1233. At around 1235, he granted it a special law, based on the Magdeburg law, but adapted to the local conditions (Środa law). It was a model on which many other Polish towns were later founded (including Opole, Kalisz, Wieliczka, Radom). The town was fortified with ramparts and a moat. The St. Andrew's Church was most likely built before Środa was granted town rights, although the oldest known mention dates back to 1233, whereas the castle was first mentioned in 1266, however, it also may have been built much earlier. It was a residence of the local dukes from the Piast dynasty and the seat of the Środa castellany. Between 1220 and 1234 a hospital was established either by Duke Henry the Bearded or Bishop of Wrocław Wawrzyniec, and by the late 13th century, there was also a parish school (at St. Andrew's Church). Possibly in 1253, the Franciscans arrived and established the town's first monastery, although the oldest known mention comes from 1318. A second hospital was founded in the late 14th century.

In the 13th century the town was a regional center of salt trade. A Merchants' House was established in 1283, a slaughterhouse operated in the town by 1307, and after 1348 merchant shops were built. Crafts and trade, including weaving, developed in the town. Since the 15th century, vines were grown, as a result of which winemaking as well as brewing developed.

In 1428–31 the town was devastated by the Hussites (especially devastating was the attack in 1428 when Hussites robbed the town and burnt down the monastery and church of Franciscan order). In 1526, the town was incorporated by the Habsburg monarchy. In the 16th century it was one of the regional centers of Anabaptism. The town was damaged in the Thirty Years' War. In 1740, the Prussian soldiers seized the town and incorporated it into the Prussian Kingdom. In 1806 it was sacked by French troops, and in 1813 by German soldiers. Together with the rest of Prussia, the town became a part of unified Germany in 1871. During World War II the Germans established there two forced labour subcamps of the Stalag VIII-A prisoner-of-war camp. On 9 February 1945, the German troops withdrew from the town and it subsequently became again part of Poland. The German population of the town fled or was expelled. In 1946, the adjective Śląska was added to the name after the region of Silesia within which the town is located, to distinguish it from the town of Środa Wielkopolska.

During renovation works in the 1980s, a hoard of medieval silver and gold coins and jewellery, named the Środa Treasure, was found. It is now displayed in the Regional Museum in Środa Śląska and the National Museum in Wrocław.

Folklore
A Silesian folk story tells how the empress of Tartary travelled through Europe until she reached Środa Śląska in 1240. The citizens decided that it was appalling for a non-Christian to display so much wealth, and killed her and all of her entourage, except two of her ladies who managed to hide and flee back to Tartary. Once there, they told the Emperor what had happened to his wife, who swore revenge and gathered an army of five hundred thousand troops. According to German antiquary Johann Gustav Gottlieb Büsching, no tradition survives telling what the outcome was, though the timespan of the story roughly corresponds with the First Mongol invasion of Poland (1240–1241). Büsching states the story was first published in a 1504 life of Saint Hedwig of Silesia, and was later turned into a folk song.

Sights
Among the heritage architecture of Środa Śląska are:
 Gothic Saint Andrew church, dating back to the 12th century
 Romanesque Nativity of Mary church, a former medieval hospital church, dating back to the 13th century
 town hall, dating back to the 14th century, now housing the Regional Museum
 medieval town walls from the 13th and 14th centuries
 Exaltation of the Holy Cross church, dating back to the 14th century
 Dominican monastery, dating back to the 18th century
 Palace
 Prosecutor's office
 Post office

Transport
A train station is located in the town.

Sports
The local football club is Polonia Środa Śląska with men's and women's sections. Both compete in the lower divisions.

Notable people
Laurentius Corvinus (1465–1527), Polish scholar
Franz Josef Kallmann (1897–1965), American psychiatrist
Hugo von Kirchbach (1809–1887), Prussian general
Leszek Kosedowski (born 1954), Polish boxer
Rościsław Żerelik (born 1956), Polish historian
Aleksandra Rus (born 2002), Polish actress

Twin towns – sister cities
See twin towns of Gmina Środa Śląska.

References

External links
Municipal website 
Jewish Community in Środa Śląska on Virtual Shtetl
Środa Śląska - Neumarkt na portalu polska-org.pl  

Cities and towns in Lower Silesian Voivodeship
Środa Śląska County